Politseymako is a surname. Notable people with the surname include:

 Maria Politseymako (born 1938), Soviet and Russian actress

Russian-language surnames